Clement Comer Clay (December 17, 1789 – September 6, 1866) was the eighth Governor of the U.S. state of Alabama from 1835 to 1837. An attorney, judge, and politician, he also was elected to the state legislature, as well as to the House of Representatives and the United States Senate.

Early years
Clay was born in Halifax County, Virginia, the son of Rebecca (Comer) and William Clay, an officer in the American Revolutionary War, who moved to Grainger County, Tennessee. Clay attended the local schools and graduated from East Tennessee College in 1807. He was admitted to the bar in 1809 and moved to Huntsville, Alabama, where he began a law practice in 1811.

Marriage and family
Clay married Susannah Claiborne Withers on April 4, 1815.  They had three sons: Clement Claiborne Clay, John Withers Clay, and Hugh Lawson Clay.

Alabama House of Representatives
Clay served in the Alabama Territorial Legislature from 1817–1818. He was a state court judge and served in the Alabama House of Representatives.

In 1828, he was elected to the U.S. House of Representatives, serving from March 4, 1829, and through re-elections until March 3, 1835, when he started as governor of Alabama.

Governor of Alabama

In 1835 Clay was elected governor. Clay's term as governor ended early when the state legislature appointed him to the United States Senate in 1837 (this was before the popular election of senators).

Spring Hill College
In 1836, Governor Clay signed a legislative act that chartered Spring Hill College in Mobile, Alabama, the third oldest Jesuit college in the United States. The charter gave it "full power to grant or confer such degree or degrees in the arts and sciences, or in any art or science as are usually granted or conferred by other seminaries of learning in the United States." The college resulted from the strong French Catholic traditions in the city, founded as a French colony.

Creek War of 1836
Clay's term in office was dominated by the Creek War of 1836 arising from resistance to Indian Removal, which had taken place in the Southeast since 1830. During Clay's administration, the United States Army removed the Creek Indians from Southeastern Alabama under the terms of the 1832 Treaty of Cusseta. The Creek were relocated to the Indian Territory (now Oklahoma) west of the Mississippi. Confrontations between Indians and white settlers occurred.

Panic of 1837
During the Panic of 1837, the United States suffered a financial crisis brought on by speculative fever. This crisis caused a run on the Bank of the State of Alabama. Clay ordered the bank to provide a detailed financial report, but it could not do so.

United States Senate
After the election by the state legislature, Clay served in the United States Senate from June 19, 1837, until his resignation on November 15, 1841.

In the year after the end of the Civil War, Clement died of natural causes in September 1866, aged 76. His wife Susanna had died earlier the same year.

Notes

References

External links

 The Political Graveyard
 

1789 births
1866 deaths
People from Halifax County, Virginia
Clay family
Jacksonian members of the United States House of Representatives from Alabama
Democratic Party United States senators from Alabama
Democratic Party governors of Alabama
Members of the Alabama Territorial Legislature
Democratic Party members of the Alabama House of Representatives
Chief Justices of the Supreme Court of Alabama
Alabama state court judges
19th-century American judges
19th-century American politicians